The Limpopo National Park was born when the status of Coutada 16 Wildlife Utilisation Area in Gaza Province, Mozambique, was changed from a hunting concession to a protected area. 
It forms part of the Great Limpopo Transfrontier Park with the Kruger National Park in South Africa and the Gonarezhou National Park in Zimbabwe.

Geography
Administratively, the park is split between Chicualacuala District, Massingir District, and Mabalane District. The park is part of the Great Limpopo Transfrontier Park, a 35,000 km² peace park that links this park, Kruger National Park in South Africa, Gonarezhou National Park, Manjinji Pan Sanctuary and Malipati Safari Area in Zimbabwe, as well as the area between Kruger and Gonarezhou, the Sengwe communal land in Zimbabwe and the Makuleke region in South Africa.

Wildlife
This park is home to mammalian species including elephant, lion, Cape wild dog, leopard, rhinoceros, blue wildebeest, spotted hyena, Cape buffalo, mongoose, kudu, giraffe, zebra, oribi, and hippopotamus.

History
With the help of R42 million donated by Germany the new park is being developed with fencing and anti-poaching units. The park is divided up into three separate zones of use: a tourist zone, a wilderness zone, and a resource utilization zone (hunting). In the south is the Massingir Dam and the town of Massingir in Massingir District, which is the administrative headquarters of the new park, while on the northern border is the Limpopo River.

In 2001 the translocation of a large number of animals from the Kruger National Park to new park had got underway. Work on the new Giriyondo Border Post between South Africa and Mozambique has started in March 2004.

 Park headquarters and staff housing were built; 
 The first tourism facilities were opened in September 2005 and include the Machampane tented camp, Machampane wilderness trail, Shingwedzi 4×4 eco-trail, Aguia Pesqueira campsite, Massingir hiking trail and Campismo Albufeira
 Phase two of tourism development in the park began in the early part of 2008. This entails developing concessions in the Boala and Madonse areas as well as a further concession at Massingir;

See also
Protected areas of Mozambique

References

External links
Official Web site
 http://arquivo.pt/wayback/20090520140254/http%3A//www.actf.gov.mz/parque_limpopo.html

National parks of Mozambique
Limpopo River
Geography of Gaza Province
Tourist attractions in Gaza Province
Zambezian and mopane woodlands